The 2015 Trophée des Alpilles was a professional tennis tournament played on hard courts. It was the seventh edition of the tournament which was part of the 2015 ATP Challenger Tour. It took place in Saint-Rémy-de-Provence, France between 7 and 13 September 2015.

Singles main-draw entrants

Seeds

 1 Rankings are as of August 31, 2015.

Other entrants
The following players received wildcards into the singles main draw:
  Sébastien Boltz
  Ivan Dodig
  Jonathan Hilaire
  Martin Vaïsse

The following players received entry as alternates:
  Sam Barry
  Hugo Nys

The following players received entry from the qualifying draw:
  Constantin Belot
  Hugo Grenier
  Alexandre Müller
  Filip Veger

The following player received entry as a lucky loser:
  Nino Portales

Champions

Singles

  Ivan Dodig def.  Nils Langer 6–3, 6–2

Doubles

  Ken Skupski /  Neal Skupski def.  Andrej Martin /  Igor Zelenay 6–4, 6–1

External links
Official website

Trophee des Alpilles
Trophée des Alpilles
2015 in French tennis